The Audit Bureau of Circulations (ABC) of India is a non-profit circulation-auditing organisation. It certifies and audits the circulations of major publications, including newspapers and magazines in India.

ABC is a voluntary organisation initiated in 1948 that operates in different parts of the world. Until 1948, the concept of circulation audit was yet to be made in India and the publishers had no means to verify the actual circulation number of publications that they used for advertising and had to depend more on their own judgement. Publishers also found it difficult to convince advertisers of the relative values of their publication for the purpose of advertising. It is with this background that eminent representatives of the advertising profession and publishing industry came together to establish an organisation which could serve the common interest. Since then, the benefit of ABC certificates of circulation have been availed by advertisers, advertising agencies, publishers and organisations connected with print media advertising. The current chairman of the Audit Bureau of Circulations (India) is Devendra Darda and the deputy chairman is Karunesh Bajaj.

History
ABC (India) was founded in 1948, India.

Qualifications
The Publisher should be a Member of The Indian Newspaper Society (INS) and the Publications should be registered with Registrar of Newspapers for India (RNI).

Publisher members must maintain essential books and records to facilitate a proper ABC audit and also appoint an independent firm of Chartered Accountants from amongst the approved panel of auditors named by ABC. Admission of publishers to ABC membership is subject to a satisfactory admission audit. ABC has a system of recheck audit and surprise check audits of publications to be carried out as and when ABC deems appropriate

The  Bureau  certifies  audited  Net  Paid  circulation  figures  of  publications  enrolled  with  it  for a continuous and definite six-monthly audit periods and supplies copies of the ABC Certificates issued for  such  publications  to  each  member.  Free  distribution  and  bulk  sales  are  also  shown  on  the certificates provided the relevant records are  adequately  maintained. Such  records  are  checked  and facts  and  figures  are  scrutinised  by impartial  Auditors, and only then is the Certificate of Net Paid Circulation issued.

See also
 Newspaper circulation
 Magazine circulation
 International Federation of Audit Bureaux of Circulations
 Audit Bureau of Circulations (UK)
 Audit Bureau of Circulations (North America) 
 OJD Morocco

References

External links
 Official website

Companies based in Mumbai
Non-profit organisations based in India
Organizations established in 1948
Newspapers circulation audit
Publishing in India
Publishing organizations
Newspaper publishing in India
1948 establishments in India